Route 419, also known as Wild Cove Road, is a short  north–south highway on the Baie Verte Peninsula of Newfoundland in the Canadian province of Newfoundland and Labrador. It connects the community of Wild Cove with the town of Baie Verte via Route 412 (Seal Cove Road), serving as the only road access to Wild Cove. There are no other major intersections or communities of any kind along the entire length of Route 419, with the highway being winding and curvy as it traverses very hilly terrain. As with most highways in Newfoundland and Labrador, the entire length of Route 419 is a two-lane highway.

Route 419 is one of only two highways in the entire province of Newfoundland and Labrador ending with the number 9, the other being Route 239 on the Bonavista Peninsula.

Major intersections

References

419